Pleasant Grove Independent School District may refer to:

 Pleasant Grove Independent School District (Bowie County, Texas)
 Pleasant Grove Independent School District (Dallas County, Texas)